This was the first edition of the event.

Andrej Martin and Igor Zelenay won the title, defeating Błażej Koniusz and Mateusz Kowalczyk in the final, 6–1, 7–5.

Seeds

  Marcelo Demoliner /  Purav Raja (first round)
  Frank Moser /  Alexander Satschko (first round)
  Adil Shamasdin /  Artem Sitak (first round)
  James Cerretani /  Andreas Siljeström (quarterfinals)

Draw

Draw

External Links
 Main Draw

Internazionali di Tennis Citta di Vicenza – Doubles
2014 Doubles
AON